Caged in Paradiso (alternate title Maximum Security) is a 1989 American action film starring Irene Cara, Peter Kowanko, Paula Bond and directed by Mike Snyder.  It was filmed on St. Thomas in the United States Virgin Islands.

Plot
Female inmates wrongly imprisoned on an island fortress plan their escape.

Sources

New York Times

1989 films
American action films
1980s English-language films
1989 action films
American prison films
Films shot in the United States Virgin Islands
1980s American films
English-language action films